Syagannakh (Sıagannaax) is a rural locality (a selo), the only inhabited locality, and the administrative center of Mugurdakhsky Rural Okrug of Abyysky District in the Sakha Republic, Russia, located  from Belaya Gora, the administrative center of the district. Its population as of the 2010 Census was 421, down from 447 recorded during the 2002 Census.

References

Notes

Sources
Official website of the Sakha Republic. Registry of the Administrative-Territorial Divisions of the Sakha Republic. Abyysky District. 

Rural localities in Abyysky District